The first season of the Philippine television reality competition show, The Clash was broadcast by GMA Network. Hosted by Regine Velasquez, Andre Paras and Joyce Pring, it premiered on July 7, 2018 on the network's Sabado Star Power sa Gabi and Sunday Grande sa Gabi line up replacing Celebrity Bluff and Lip Sync Battle Philippines in their respective timeslots. The judges are composed of Ai-Ai delas Alas, Lani Misalucha and Christian Bautista. The season concluded on September 30, 2018 with a total of 26 episodes. Golden Cañedo was declared as the winner. It was replaced by Daddy's Gurl and Studio 7 in its timeslots.

Auditions

Auditions took place in the following cities:

After the city auditions, The Clash also gave the hopefuls an alternative way to audition via online.

Top 62
The top 62 clashers were selected by respected personalities from the music industry including songwriter Vehnee Saturno; songwriter, music producer, and South Border lead singer Jay Durias; and TV director Bert de Leon.

The 62 clashers (competitors) were electronically paired to battle it out in a singing duel with the winner advancing to the next round. The losers were temporarily eliminated in the first round until two of them were electronically selected to return for a breakout as wild card contender in the single seat remaining out of the 32 seats that qualify for round two.

Color key

	
  Winner
  Runner-up 
  Finalists
  Eliminated in the Fourth Round
  Eliminated in the Third Round
  Eliminated in the Second Round
  Eliminated in the First Round
 Underlined name was the clasher who won the Wild Card round.

aJong Madaliday was reinstated in the competition after beating out Kyryll Ugdiman in The Clash Back on September 23, 2018.

Round 1: One on One
The randomizer electronically select the clashers that will face each other in the clash arena. After their performance, the clash panel selects who will advance to the next round. They need to get at least majority of the panels votes.

Color key

Episode 1 (July 7)
The episode opens with a production number from the top 62 clashers singing Queen's "We Will Rock You", Bon Jovi's "Its My Life", Journey's "Don't Stop Believin'", Shawn Mendes' "There's Nothing Holdin' Me Back" and Rachel Platten's "Fight Song".

Episode hashtag: #TheFirstClash

Episode 2 (July 8)
Episode hashtag: #TheClashOneOnOne

Episode 3 (July 14)
Episode hashtag: #TopOfTheClash

Episode 4 (July 15)
Episode hashtag: #TheClashTapatan

Episode 5 (July 21)
Episode hashtag: #TheClashTanggalan

Episode 6 (July 22)
Episode hashtag: #ClasherVsClasher

Episode 7 (July 28)
Episode hashtag: #TheClashBiritan

Episode 8 (July 29)
Episode hashtag: #TheClashFinalSeats

Wild card 
The wild card clashers, a pair of two, were selected by the judges among the losers in the first round. The chosen pair were Ron Michael Tumaneng and Angela Noveno, both from episode 6.

Round 2: Laban Kung Laban
The randomizer electronically select one clasher that will choose his/her opponent per round.  Meanwhile, the chosen opponent decides who to sing first. After their performance, the clash panel selects who will advance to the next round and will stay on top of the clash. They need to get at least majority of the panels votes.

Color key

Episode 9 (August 4)
The episode is where the wild card contending pair battled for the last seat remaining of the 32-seat semi-finalists group of competitors.

Episode hashtag: #TheClashLabanKungLaban

Non-competition performance: Top 32 clashers with clash master Regine Velasquez singing The Clash theme song "Mangarap Ka, Laban Pa" by Quest.

Episode 10 (August 5)
Episode hashtag: #TheClashAngHamon

Episode 11 (August 11)
Episode hashtag: #TheClashSagupaan

Episode 12 (August 12)
Episode hashtag: #TheClashBakbakan

1The clasher was selected by the host.

Round 3: Pares Kontra Pares
In this round, the clashers were paired. The randomizer select one clasher that will choose his/her partner for a duet. Below is the groupings selection. Italicized names are those electronically selected.

For each set, a pair will be chosen electronically that will choose their opponent pair. After the performance, the clash panel will vote for a pair that will advance on the next round. For the losing pair, they will compete on each other in Matira ang Matibay round and only one will remain, still subject for the votes of the clash panel.

Color key

Episode 13 (August 18)
Episode hashtag: #TheClashParesKontraPares

Non-competition performance: "Walang Hanggan" by Regine Velasquez and Quest

Episode 14 (August 19)
Episode hashtag: #TheClashKakampiKalaban

Non-competition performance: "Sirena" by Lani Misalucha and Gloc-9

Episode 15 (August 25)
Episode hashtag: #TheClashDuetoDuelo

Non-competition performance: "Hayaan Mo Sila" by Ex Battalion and "Walang Pinipili" by Ai-Ai delas Alas and Ex Battalion

Episode 16 (August 26)
Episode hashtag: #TheClashRoadTo12

Non-competition performance: "Kapit" and "Rainbow" by Christian Bautista and Jay Durias

Round 4: Isa Laban sa Lahat
This is the final round of the competition. Every week, after the performances, the judges will select their top clashers (number depends on every episode) who will stay on the competition while the bottom two clashers will face-off on Matira ang Matibay round on which one clasher will be safe while the other will be eliminated.

Color key

Top 12
The randomizer selected a clasher who will pick a set of clashers that will perform on the episode. Each clasher will pick an envelope to determine their order.

The songs performed on this week are called "Awit ng Buhay" of the clashers.

Episode 17 (September 1)
Episode hashtag: #TheClashRound4

Non-competition performance: "Lipad" by Regine Velasquez and "Puso" by Top 12 Clashers

Matira ang Matibay

Episode 18 (September 2)
Episode hashtag: #TheClashBagongLaban

Matira ang Matibay

Top 10
Jong Madaliday was absent on this week due to health reasons. In this case, he will automatically be sent to the Bottom 2 next week prior to the rules of the show.

The songs performed on this week are "Dedication" songs of the clashers to someone.

Episode 19 (September 8)
Episode hashtag: #TheClashTopTen

Non-competition performance: "Royals" and "R.E.S.P.E.C.T" by Top 10 Clashers and Lani Misalucha

Matira ang Matibay

Episode 20 (September 9)
Episode hashtag: #TheClashBattleToEight

Matira ang Matibay
This Matira ang Matibay clash was aired on Episode 21.

Top 8
This week is a one-on-one battle. The randomizer selects two clashers and the clash master asks the seated clashers who wants to battle the clashers standing. They are given 15 seconds and if more than one stands, the electronically selected clasher will select whom he/she wants to fight. In each order, only one will be safe while the other will become bottom two and will battle on Matira ang Matibay round.

Episode 21 (September 15)
Episode hashtag: #TheClashMatindingLaban

Matira ang Matibay

Episode 22 (September 16)
Episode hashtag: #TheClashTumayoAngMatapang

Non-competition performance: "Liwanag Sa Dilim (Kaya mo 'to)" by Christian Bautista and Top 7

Matira ang Matibay

Top 6
At the end of episode 22, each clash panel randomly pick two clashers that they will mentor and choose their songs to sing. They are also responsible in picking the order of performance by draw lots.

There is no Matira ang Matibay clash on this round instead the bottom clasher will battle the wildcard clasher on the next episode.

Episode 23 (September 22)
Episode hashtag: #TheClashPasabog

The Clash Back
Six clashers who were eliminated on Round 4 has the chance to return to the competition by being a wildcard. One of them competes to Kyryll Ugdiman on Matira ang Matibay clash.

The safe clashers are responsible in picking the order of wildcard performance by draw lots.

Episode 24 (September 23)
Episode hashtag: #ClashBack

Matira ang Matibay

Final Top 6

Episode 25 (September 29)
Episode hashtag: #TheClashMatiraAngMatibay

Matira ang Matibay

The Final Clash 2018
The randomizer selects one clasher to perform first then she choose who to sing next and so on. Only two clashers will advance to the Ultimate Final Clash to determine the grand champion of this season. The winner will be respectively given by Lilybeth Rasonable and Senator Cynthia Villar.

Episode 26 (September 30)
Episode hashtag: #TheFinalClash

Non-competition performance: "A Million Dreams" and "Rewrite the Stars" by Top 12 Clashers, Clash panel and Clash master

Special award:
2018 Most Loved Clasher: Esterlina Olmedo

Ultimate Final Clash

Victory song performance: "Ngayon ang Tagumpay" by Golden Cañedo

Elimination chart 
Color key

The Clash of 2018: Ang Concert Para sa Lahat
Is a 2-part graduation concert special of the program that aired on October 6 and 7, 2018.

Part 1 (October 6)
Episode hashtag: #TheClashConcert

Part 2 (October 7)
Episode hashtag: #TheClashOf2018

Notable contestants
Top 62
 Niña Espinosa, Sixto Tolitol, and Bea Sacramento are regional contenders in the first season of It's Showtime's Tawag ng Tanghalan. Espinosa later return to the show and compete in the third season before finishing in the first week of the live shows.
 Fatima Espiritu was a member of Lea Salonga's team on the first season of The Voice Teens and was eliminated in the Battle rounds.
 Dom Alviola was a semi-finalist on the first season of It's Showtime's Tawag ng Tanghalan.
 Regielyn Fernandez failed to pass the Blind Auditions on the first season of The Voice Teens.
 Robert Cozma failed to pass the Blind Auditions on the first season of The Voice of the Philippines.
 Tristan Perfecto was part of Team apl.de.ap on the first season of The Voice of the Philippines and was eliminated on the Live Shows.

Top 32
 Muriel Lomadilla finished in tenth place as one of the Top 36 acts in the third season of Pilipinas Got Talent where Clash panelist Ai-Ai delas Alas was one of the judges.
 Willy Cordovalez was recently a contestant in Tanghalan ng Kampeon. He was a semifinalist of the Top 36 acts alongside Lomadilla in the third season of Pilipinas Got Talent where Clash panelist Ai-Ai delas Alas was one of the judges. He also previously appeared on The Voice of the Philippines and Tawag ng Tanghalan.
 Alliyah Cadeliña was one of the runners-up of the singing competition segment, Music Hero: The Vocal Battle in Eat Bulaga!
 Joana Sy and Lowell Jumalon are both regional contenders on It's Showtime's Tawag ng Tanghalan.
 Princess Culala was a daily winner on Tawag ng Tanghalan.
 Bryan Chong was a member of Sarah Geronimo's team on the first season of The Voice Teens where he is eliminated in the Knockouts to the eventual winner, Jona Marie Soquite.

Top 12
 Garrett Bolden was one of the Top 36 acts in the first season of Pilipinas Got Talent where Clash panelist Ai-Ai delas Alas was one of the judges before he was eliminated in the second week of the semifinals. He recently tried out to other international singing competition shows, including the second season of Asia's Got Talent and the fourteenth season of The X Factor, and was the defending champion in the first season of It's Showtime's Tawag ng Tanghalan.
 Melbelline Caluag was one of the eight contestants in the third season of Talentadong Pinoy.
 The following top twelve finalists have recently appeared on It's Showtime's Tawag ng Tanghalan:
 Golden Cañedo, born as Romamae Apa-ap, was the regional contender representing Visayas in the second season.
 Mirriam Manalo was the regional contender, representing Luzon in the first season.
 Lyra Micolob was the defending champion in the first season.
 Anthony Rosaldo was the regional contender, representing Metro Manila in the first season.
 Jong Madaliday was recently a contestant in the talent competition segment PINASikat as the lead singer of the three-piece music group BMP on It's Showtime.
 Kyryll Ugdiman was a member of Bamboo Mañalac's team on the first season of The Voice Teens and was eliminated in the first week of the Live Shows after her coach choose to save Isabela Vinzon who later finished as the runner-up.

References

External links
 

2018 Philippine television seasons